Narong Jansawek (born August 10, 1986), simply known as Yo, is a Thai professional footballer who plays as an attacking midfielder for Thai League 2 club Krabi.

International career

In 2013, he was called up to the national team by Surachai Jaturapattarapong to the 2015 AFC Asian Cup qualification.
In October, 2013 he debut for Thailand in a friendly match against Bahrain.
In October 15, 2013 he played against Iran in the 2015 AFC Asian Cup qualification.

International

Honours

Club
Uthai Thani
Thai League 3 (1): 2021–22
Thai League 3 Northern Region (1): 2021–22

References

External links
 Profile at Goal
 N. Jansawek

1986 births
Living people
Narong Jansawek
Narong Jansawek
Association football midfielders
Narong Jansawek
Narong Jansawek
Narong Jansawek
Narong Jansawek
Narong Jansawek
Narong Jansawek
Narong Jansawek
Narong Jansawek